Rhinella arenarum is a species of toad in the family Bufonidae that is found in southern Brazil and Uruguay; it can also occur in Paraguay. It is also found in Argentina from the Chubut Province northward and Bolivia east of the Andes. Rhinella arenarum inhabits small ponds or bogs with stagnant water, in dry, temperate habitats, mostly in open areas. It is locally common. While it is collected for educational and scientific uses and also suffers from road kills,  it in general is not threatened. Fossils representing this species are known with certainty from the late Pliocene to the Holocene of central Argentina.

References

arenarum
Amphibians described in 1867
Amphibians of Brazil
Amphibians of Bolivia
Amphibians of Argentina
Amphibians of Uruguay
Taxonomy articles created by Polbot
Southern Andean Yungas